The Toledo Storm were a minor league professional ice hockey team in the ECHL from 1991 to 2007. The Storm played their home games at the venerable Toledo Sports Arena along the eastern banks of the Maumee River in Toledo, Ohio. The team colors were red and white, similar to the Detroit Red Wings, their NHL affiliate for fourteen of their sixteen seasons.  The Storm would win six division titles, two Henry Brabham Cups and two Jack Riley Cups as champion of the East Coast Hockey League.  The franchise suspended operations following the 2006–07 season after they were sold to Toledo Arena Sports, Inc. The Storm returned to the ECHL for the 2009–10 season as the Toledo Walleye.

The Storm's logo was notorious for poor appearance, and was voted "Worst Logo" in The Hockey News annual survey of minor league hockey logos several times.

History

McSorley era (1991–94) 
The Toledo Storm were founded in 1991, joining the East Coast Hockey League for the 1991–92 season as an expansion franchise with two other Ohio franchises, the Columbus Chill and Dayton Bombers, and the Raleigh IceCaps of Raleigh, North Carolina.  The Storm's first head coach was Chris McSorley, older brother of NHLer Marty McSorley, Chris McSorley had previously played for the Toledo Goaldiggers of the International Hockey League from 1984–86.  One of McSorley's first actions as head coach would be to procure an affiliation agreement with the NHL's Detroit Red Wings, a team that was heavily supported by Toledo hockey fans as Detroit was within an hour drive of Toledo.  In the first year under McSorley, the Storm would play to an impressive record of 46–15–3, winning the West Division title and the Brabham Cup as the team with the best overall record during the ECHL's regular season.  Despite the regular season success, the Storm would fall in the first round of the ECHL playoffs, being upset by the Louisville Icehawks four games to one.

The following season, McSorley would once again ice a very competitive team, posting a regular season record of 36–17–11 and a second consecutive West Division title for the Storm and defenceman Derek Booth would become the first member of the team to win an ECHL award, as he was named the Defenseman of the Year for the 1992–93 season.  The Storm's finish in the top three of the West Division granted them a bye to the West Division semifinals of the 1993 Riley Cup playoffs.  The Storm would be matched with the West Division's fourth place team, the Erie Panthers, who had defeated the Greensboro Monarchs in the second round of the playoffs.  The Storm took the first two games of the series at the Toledo Sports Arena 6–3 and 5–2, before Erie won Game Three 9–6 at Louis J. Tullio Arena in the highest scoring game of the 1992–93 Riley Cup playoffs.  The Storm would close out the series in Game Four, defeating Erie 6–2 to move to the West Division Finals against the West Division's third place team the Nashville Knights who had swept the West Division's second seed the Dayton Bombers.

Toledo would once again take the first two games of the series defeating Nashville 3–1 in Game One and 7–4 in Game Two.  When the series moved back to Nashville, the Knights would take Game Three with a 4–3 overtime victory and tie the series with a 3–2 victory in Game Four.  Toledo would take Game Five in Toledo 8–2 and finish the series off with a 9–5 victory in Game Six in Nashville, to earn the first trip to the Riley Cup Finals in club history where they would play the Brabham Cup titleholder Wheeling Thunderbirds.  Wheeling would take the first two games of the series 5–3 and 7–3, but the Storm would tie the series when it moved to Toledo, winning Game Three 4–3 and Game Four 7–5.  Toledo would take control of the series with a 4–2 victory in Wheeling in Game Five and would clinch their first Riley Cup championship with a 7–6 overtime win in Game Six.  Forward Rick Judson was named the Riley Cup Playoffs Most Valuable Player in Toledo's first league championship since the Toledo Goaldiggers won the IHL's Turner Cup during the 1982–83 season.

Later years 

The Storm celebrated their 15th-anniversary during the 2005–06 season, adopting a new logo marking the occasion. The Storm's last season of operation was 2006–2007. The final game was played April 19, 2007, at U.S. Bank Arena against the Cincinnati Cyclones in the North Division Semifinals. The Cyclones won 3–0, sweeping the series in three games.

Women's hockey firsts 
The Toledo Storm once featured a female goaltender, Erin Whitten, who on March 7, 1996 became the first woman ever to appear in a professional hockey game in a position other than goaltender; she played at forward for 18 seconds in a game against the Madison Monsters. She was the first U.S.-born woman to play professional hockey when she appeared for the East Coast Hockey League's Toledo Storm, and on October 30, 1993, became the first woman goaltender to record a professional victory.

List of NHL affiliates 
Detroit Red Wings (1991–99, 2000–07)
Nashville Predators (2002–04)
San Jose Sharks (2005–07)

Season-by-season record

Franchise records

All-time leaders

Head coaches 
Chris McSorley, 1991–94
Greg Puhalski, 1994–98
Murray Eaves, 1998–99
Todd Gordon, 1999–00
Dennis Holland, 2000–02
Claude Noel, 2002–03
Steve Harrison, 2003–04
Nick Vitucci, 2003–07

Awards and honors 

Jack Riley Cup
ECHL playoff champion
1992–93, 1993–94

Henry Brabham Cup
ECHL regular season champion
1991–92, 2002–03

Riley Cup Playoffs Most Valuable Player
Rick Judson: 1993
Dave Gagnon: 1994

ECHL Most Valuable Player
Andrew Williamson: 1999–00

John Brophy Award
ECHL Coach of the year
Claude Noel: 2002–03
Nick Vitucci: 2004–05

ECHL Defenseman of the Year
Derek Booth: 1992–93

ECHL Goaltender of the Year
Nick Vitucci: 1997–98

ECHL Rookie of the Year
Sean Venedam: 1997–98

References

External links
 Toledo Walleye Official Site
 Toledo Storm All-Time Roster

Defunct ECHL teams
Sports teams in Toledo, Ohio
Detroit Red Wings minor league affiliates
Nashville Predators minor league affiliates
San Jose Sharks minor league affiliates
Tampa Bay Lightning minor league affiliates
Ice hockey clubs established in 1991
Ice hockey clubs disestablished in 2007
Ice hockey teams in Ohio
1991 establishments in Ohio
2007 disestablishments in Ohio